The Last Days of Patton is a 1986 American made-for-television biographical drama film and sequel to the 1970 film Patton, which portrays the last few months of the general's life. George C. Scott reprises the role of General George S. Patton, and Eva Marie Saint portrays Beatrice Patton, the general's wife. It was directed by Delbert Mann.

Plot
As a result of General George S. Patton's (George C. Scott) decision to use former Nazis to help reconstruct post-World War II occupied Germany (and publicly defending the practice), General Dwight Eisenhower (Richard Dysart) removes him from that task and reassigns him to supervise "an army of clerks" whose task is to write the official history of the U.S. military involvement in World War II.

Shortly thereafter, on December 9, 1945 (a day before he was to transfer back to the United States), Patton is involved in an automobile accident that seriously injures his spinal column, paralyzing him. As he lies in his hospital bed, he flashes back to earlier pivotal moments in his life, including stories his father told him of his grandfather's service during the American Civil War which inspired him to attend the United States Military Academy at West Point, his marriage to his wife Beatrice (Eva Marie Saint), and his championing of the use of tanks in the United States Army.

President Harry S. Truman and other government officials, not wanting Patton to die on German soil, order him transferred to a stateside hospital. Preparations, including a full plaster body cast, are made, but Patton dies of an embolism on December 21, 1945.

Cast
 George C. Scott as General George S. Patton
 Eva Marie Saint as Beatrice Patton
 Murray Hamilton as Brigadier General Hobart "Hap" Gay
 Ed Lauter as Lieutenant Colonel (Doctor) Paul Hill
 Richard Dysart as General of The Army Dwight D. Eisenhower
 Kathryn Leigh Scott as Jean Gordon (Red Cross), Beatrice Patton's niece and the general's onetime mistress.
 Ron Berglas as Lieutenant George S. Patton
 Horst Janson as Baron Von Wangenheim  
 Daniel Benzali as Colonel Glen Spurling
 Don Fellows as Lieutenant General Walter Bedell Smith  
 Errol John as Sergeant 1st Class George Meeks  
 Alan MacNaughton as Brigadier General (Doctor) Hugh Cairns  
 Paul Maxwell as Lieutenant General Geoffrey Keyes 
 Lee Patterson as Colonel Paul Harkins  
 Shane Rimmer as Colonel (Doctor) Lawrence Ball
 Michael Domenico as 8-year-old George S. Patton
 Keith Edwards as George S. Patton Sr.
 Oscar Quitak as Fritz Schäffer

Awards and nominations

References

External links
 
 
 

1986 television films
1986 films
1980s historical drama films
American television films
American biographical films
American historical drama films
American World War II films
World War II films based on actual events
Films directed by Delbert Mann
Cultural depictions of George S. Patton
Cultural depictions of Dwight D. Eisenhower
1980s American films